1366 Piccolo, provisional designation , is an asteroid from the background population of the outer asteroid belt, approximately 28 kilometers in diameter. It was discovered on 29 November 1932, by astronomer Eugène Delporte at the Royal Observatory of Belgium in Uccle. The asteroid was named after Auguste Cauvin, chief-editor of the Belgian newspaper Le Soir.

Orbit and classification 

Piccolo is a non-family asteroid of the main belt's background population. It orbits the Sun in the outer asteroid belt at a distance of 2.5–3.3 AU once every 4 years and 10 months (1,780 days; semi-major axis of 2.87 AU). Its orbit has an eccentricity of 0.14 and an inclination of 9° with respect to the ecliptic.

The body's observation arc begins at Uccle with its official discovery observation.

Naming 

This minor planet was named after the pseudonym of Auguste Cauvin, also known as "d'Arsac", long-time editor-in-chief of the Belgian newspaper Le Soir (c. 1898–1937). The pseudonym "piccolo" means "small" in Italian. The official naming citation was mentioned in The Names of the Minor Planets by Paul Herget in 1955. Asteroid 1350 Rosselia was also named after an editor of Le Soir by Delporte.

Physical characteristics 

Piccolo has been characterized as an X-type asteroid by Pan-STARRS photometric survey, while the LCDB assumes a stony S-type.

Rotation period and poles 

In June 1984, a first rotational lightcurve of Piccolo was obtained from photometric observations by American astronomer Richard Binzel. Lightcurve analysis gave a rotation period of 16.57 hours with a brightness variation of 0.33 magnitude. In 2003 and 2005, two more lightcurves were obtained by French amateur astronomer René Roy. They gave a period of 16.048 and 16.05 hours and an amplitude of 0.24 and 0.29 magnitude, respectively.

In 2016, the asteroid lightcurve has also been modeled using photometric data from various sources. It gave a concurring period of 16.1834 hours and two spin axis in ecliptic coordinates of (352.0°, 49.0°) and (201.0°, 55.0°).

Diameter and albedo 

According to the surveys carried out by the Infrared Astronomical Satellite IRAS, the Japanese Akari satellite and the NEOWISE mission of NASA's Wide-field Infrared Survey Explorer, Piccolo measures between 26.92 and 28.02 kilometers in diameter and its surface has an albedo between 0.1538 and 0.199. In April 2003, an albedo of 0.131 and a diameter of 29.9 kilometers have also been deduced from a stellar occultation.

The Collaborative Asteroid Lightcurve Link derives an albedo of 0.1447 and a diameter of 27.50 kilometers based on an absolute magnitude of 10.52.

References

External links 
 Asteroid Lightcurve Database (LCDB), query form (info )
 Dictionary of Minor Planet Names, Google books
 Asteroids and comets rotation curves, CdR – Observatoire de Genève, Raoul Behrend
 Discovery Circumstances: Numbered Minor Planets (1)-(5000) – Minor Planet Center
 
 

001366
Discoveries by Eugène Joseph Delporte
Named minor planets
19321129